The dress worn by Jacqueline Bouvier for her wedding to John F. Kennedy in 1953 is one of the best-remembered bridal gowns of all time.

The gown was the creation of fashion designer Ann Lowe, who was not credited as the designer at the time of the Bouvier-Kennedy wedding.

Design

Janet Lee Bouvier, Jacqueline's mother, hired Lowe to design and make the entire bridal party's outfits. Lowe had made Bouvier's dress for her wedding to Hugh Auchincloss.

The bridal gown, of ivory-colored silk taffeta, featured a portrait neckline and huge round skirt. The skirt featured interwoven tucking bands and tiny wax flowers. Jacqueline Bouvier's lace veil had belonged to her grandmother; a lace-and-orange-blossom tiara tied the veil to her hair. Her bridal bouquet was made of white and pink gardenias and orchids.

She wore little jewelry with the dress, but what she did wear had personal significance. The single-strand pearl necklace was a family heirloom; she also wore a diamond pin from her parents and diamond bracelet from her groom, John F. Kennedy.

A flood in Lowe's Lexington Avenue workshop 10 days before the wedding ruined the bride's gown and nine of the bridal party's dresses. Ann Lowe and her staff worked through eight days (the original time was eight weeks) to reconstruct the gowns and ensure they were delivered on time. Instead of an estimated $700 profit, Lowe lost $2,200 on the project.

Reception
The dress was crafted in a very traditional design (particularly the skirt) per the wishes of the Kennedy family, and it won worldwide acclaim. However, Jacqueline had wanted a simple dress with firm lines to complement her tall, slim figure. She later told friends privately that she did not like the dress's portrait neckline because she felt it emphasized her small bust. She also said that the skirt looked "like a lampshade".

The New York Times coverage of the wedding described Jacqueline's wedding attire in detail, referring to the gown as "a gown of ivory silk taffeta, made with a fitted bodice embellished with interwoven bands of tucking, finished with a portrait neckline, and a bouffant skirt." However, the Times did not name the gown's designer, Ann Lowe. By the mid-1960s, however, Lowe was publicly acknowledged as the designer of the gown.

See also
 List of individual dresses

References

1950s fashion
Wedding dresses
Jacqueline Kennedy Onassis